Konik may refer to:

Konik, a small Polish semi-feral horse
Konik, Podlaskie Voivodeship, a village in the region of Podlachia
Konik, Montenegro, a suburb of Podgorica
Konik (surname)
 Konik (ritual), a Polish folk tradition